Format of entries is:
 ICAO (IATA) – Airport Name – Airport Location

GA - Mali 

 GAAO – Ansongo Airport – Ansongo
 GABD – Bandiagara Airport – Bandiagara
 GABF – Bafoulabe Airport – Bafoulabe
 GABG – Bougouni Airport – Bougouni
 GABR – Bourem Airport – Bourem
 GABS (BKO) – Modibo Keita International Airport – Bamako
 GADZ – Douentza Airport – Douentza
 GAGM (GUD) – Goundam Airport – Goundam
 GAGO (GAQ) – Gao International Airport (Korogoussou Airport) – Gao
 GAKA (KNZ) – Kenieba Airport – Kenieba
 GAKD (KYS) – Kayes Airport – Kayes
 GAKL – Kidal Airport – Kidal
 GAKN – Kolokani Airport – Kolokani
 GAKO (KTX) – Koutiala Airport – Koutiala
 GAKT – Kita Airport – Kita
 GAMA – Markala Airport – Markala
 GAMB (MZI) – Mopti Airport (Ambodedjo Airport) – Mopti
 GAMK – Menaka Airport – Ménaka, Ménaka Cercle
 GANF – Niafunke Airport – Niafunké
 GANK (NRM) – Keibane Airport – Nara
 GANR (NIX) – Nioro Airport – Nioro
 GASK (KSS) – Sikasso Airport – Sikasso
 GATB (TOM) – Tombouctou Airport – Tombouctou
 GATS – Tessalit Airport – Tessalit
 GAYE (EYL) – Yelimane Airport – Yélimané

GB - The Gambia 

 GBYD (BJL) – Banjul International Airport (Yundum Int'l) – Banjul

GC - Canary Islands (Spain) 
Also see airport category (Canary Islands) and list (Spain).

 GCFV (FUE) – Fuerteventura Airport – Fuerteventura
 GCGM (GMZ) – La Gomera Airport – La Gomera
 GCHI (VDE) – El Hierro Airport – El Hierro
 GCLA (SPC) – La Palma Airport – La Palma
 GCLP (LPA) – Gran Canaria Airport – Las Palmas
 GCRR (ACE) – Lanzarote Airport – Arrecife, Lanzarote
 GCTS (TFS) – Tenerife South Airport – Santa Cruz de Tenerife
 GCXO (TFN) – Tenerife North Airport – Tenerife

GE - Ceuta and Melilla (Spain) 
 (Spain)

 GECE (JCU) – Ceuta Heliport – Ceuta
 GEML (MLN) – Melilla Airport – Melilla

GF - Sierra Leone 

 GFBN (BTE) – Sherbro International Airport – Bonthe
 GFBO (KBS) – Bo Airport – Bo
 GFGK (GBK) – Gbangbatok Airport – Gbangbatoke
 GFHA (HGS) – Hastings Airport – Freetown
 GFKB (KBA) – Kabala Airport – Kabala
 GFKE (KEN) – Kenema Airport – Kenema
 GFLL (FNA) – Lungi International Airport – Freetown
 GFYE (WYE) – Yengema Airport – Yengema

GG - Guinea-Bissau 

 GGBU (BQE) – Bubaque Airport – Bubaque
 GGCF – Cufar Airport – Cufar
 GGOV (OXB) – Osvaldo Vieira International Airport – Bissau

GL - Liberia 

 GLBU (UCN) – Buchanan Airport – Buchanan
 GLCP (CPA) – Cape Palmas Airport – Harper
 GLGE (SNI) – Greenville/Sinoe Airport – Greenville (Sinoe)
 GLLB – Lamco Airport – Buchanan
 GLMR (MLW) – Spriggs Payne Airport – Monrovia
 GLNA (NIA) – Nimba Airport – Nimba
 GLRB (ROB) – Roberts International Airport – Monrovia
 GLST (SAZ) – Sasstown Airport – Sasstown
 GLTN (THC) – Tchien Airport – Tchien
 GLVA (VOI) – Voinjama Airport – Voinjama

GM - Morocco 

 GMAA       – Inezgane Airport – Agadir, Souss-Massa-Drâa
 GMAD (AGA) – Al Massira Airport – Agadir, Souss-Massa-Drâa
 GMAG (GLN) – Guelmim Airport – Guelmim, Guelmim-Es Semara
 GMAT (TTA) – Tan Tan Airport (Plage Blanche Airport) – Tan Tan, Guelmim-Es Semara
 GMAZ (OZG) – Zagora Airport – Zagora, Souss-Massa-Drâa
 GMFA       – Ouezzane Airport – Ouezzane, Gharb-Chrarda-Béni Hssen
 GMFB (UAR) – Bouarfa Airport – Bouarfa, Oriental
 GMFF (FEZ) – Saïss Airport – Fes, Fès-Boulemane
 GMFI       – Ifrane Airport – Ifrane, Meknès-Tafilalet
 GMFK (ERH) – Moulay Ali Cherif Airport – Errachidia, Meknès-Tafilalet
 GMFM (MEK) – Bassatine Air Base (Second Royal Air Force Base) – Meknes, Meknès-Tafilalet
 GMFO (OUD) – Angads Airport – Oujda, Oriental
 GMFU       – Sefrou Airport – Fes, Fès-Boulemane
 GMFZ       – Taza Airport – Taza, Taza-Al Hoceima-Taounate
 GMMB (GMD) – Ben Slimane Airport – Ben Slimane, Chaouia-Ouardigha
 GMMC (CAS) – Anfa Airport – Casablanca, Greater Casablanca
 GMMD       – Beni Mellal Airport – Beni Mellal, Tadla-Azilal
 GMME (RBA) – Rabat-Salé Airport (First Royal Air Force Base) – Rabat / Salé, Rabat-Salé-Zemmour-Zaer
 GMMF (SII) – Sidi Ifni Airport – Sidi Ifni, Souss-Massa-Drâa
 GMMI (ESU) – Mogador Airport – Essaouira (Mogador), Marrakech-Tensift-El Haouz
 GMMJ       – El Jadida Airport – El Jadida, Doukkala-Abda
 GMML (EUN) – Hassan I Airport – Laayoune
 GMMN (CMN) – Mohammed V International Airport – Casablanca, Greater Casablanca
 GMMO       – Taroudant Airport – Taroudannt, Souss-Massa-Drâa
 GMMS       – Safi Airport – Safi, Doukkala-Abda
 GMMT       – Tit Mellil Airport – Casablanca, Greater Casablanca
 GMMW (NDR) – Nador Airport (Al Aroui Airport) – Nador, Oriental
 GMMX (RAK) – Marrakech-Menara Airport – Marrakech, Marrakech-Tensift-El Haouz
 GMMP (NNA) – Kenitra Air Base (Third Royal Air Force Base) – Kenitra, Gharb-Chrarda-Béni Hssen
 GMMZ (OZZ) – Ouarzazate Airport – Ouarzazate, Souss-Massa-Drâa
 GMSL       – Sidi Slimane Air Base (Fifth Royal Air Force Base) – Sidi Slimane, Gharb-Chrarda-Béni Hssen
 GMTA (AHU) – Cherif Al Idrissi Airport – Al Hoceima, Taza-Al Hoceima-Taounate
 GMTN (TTU) – Sania Ramel Airport – Tétouan, Tangier-Tétouan
 GMTT (TNG) – Ibn Battouta Airport – Tangier (Tanger), Tangier-Tétouan

GO - Senegal 

 GOBD (DSS) – Blaise Diagne International Airport – Dakar
 GOGG (ZIG) – Ziguinchor Airport – Ziguinchor
 GOGK (KDA) – Kolda North Airport – Kolda
 GOGS (CSK) – Cap Skiring Airport – Cap Skiring
 GOOK (KLC) – Kaolack Airport – Kaolack
 GOOY (DKR) – Léopold Sédar Senghor International Airport – Dakar
 GOSM (MAX) – Ouro Sogui Airport – Matam
 GOSP (POD) – Podor Airport – Podor
 GOSR (RDT) – Richard Toll Airport – Richard Toll
 GOSS (XLS) – Saint-Louis Airport – Saint-Louis
 GOTB (BXE) – Bakel Airport – Bakel
 GOTK (KGG) – Kédougou Airport – Kédougou
 GOTS (SMY) – Simenti Airport – Simenti
 GOTT (TUD) – Tambacounda Airport – Tambacounda

GQ - Mauritania 

 GQNA (AEO) – Aioun el Atrouss Airport – Aioun el Atrouss
 GQNB (OTL) – Boutilimit Airport – Boutilimit
 GQNC (THI) – Tichitt Airport – Tichitt
 GQND (TIY) – Tidjikja Airport – Tidjikja
 GQNE (BGH) – Abbaye Airport – Boghé
 GQNF (KFA) – Kiffa Airport – Kiffa
 GQNH (TMD) – Timbedra Airport – Timbedra
 GQNI (EMN) – Nema Airport – Néma
 GQNJ (AJJ) – Akjoujt Airport – Akjoujt
 GQNK (KED) – Kaedi Airport – Kaédi
 GQNL (MOM) – Letfotar Airport – Moudjeria
 GQNM – Dahara Airport – Timbedra
 GQNN (NKC) – Nouakchott International Airport (closed) – Nouakchott
 GQNO (NKC) – Nouakchott-Oumtounsy International Airport – Nouakchott
 GQNS (SEY) – Selibaby Airport – Selibaby
 GQNT (THT) – Tamchakett Airport – Tamchakett
 GQPA (ATR) – Atar International Airport – Atar
 GQPF (FGD) – Fderik Airport – Fderik
 GQPP (NDB) – Nouadhibou International Airport – Nouadhibou
 GQPT – Bir Moghrein Airport – Bir Moghrein
 GQPZ (OUZ) – Tazadit Airport – Zouérat

GS - Western Sahara 
Note: These airports now also have ICAO codes starting with GM.

 GSAI (EUN) – Hassan I Airport (El Aaiún Airport) – El Aaiún (Laâyoune) (also see GMML)
 GSMA (SMW) – Smara Airport – Smara (also see GMMA)
 GSVO (VIL) – Dakhla Airport – Dakhla (Villa Cisneros) (also see GMMH)

GU - Guinea 

 GUCY (CKY) – Conakry International Airport (Gbessia Int'l) – Conakry
 GUFA (FIG) – Fria Airport – Fria
 GUFH (FAA) – Faranah Airport – Faranah
 GUGO – Gbenko Airport – Banankoro
 GUKR – Kawass Airport – Port Kamsar
 GUKU (KSI) – Kissidougou Airport – Kissidougou
 GULB (LEK) – Tata Airport – Labe
 GUMA (MCA) – Macenta Airport – Macenta
 GUNZ (NZE) – Nzérékoré Airport – N'zerekore
 GUOK (BKJ) – Boké Baralande Airport – Boké
 GUSA – Sangaredi Airport – Sangarédi, Guinea
 GUSB (SBI) – Sambailo Airport – Koundara
 GUSI (GII) – Siguiri Airport – Siguiri
 GUXD (KNN) – Kankan Airport – Kankan

GV - Cape Verde 

 GVAC (SID) – Amílcar Cabral International Airport – Espargos, Sal
 GVAN (NTO) – Agostinho Neto Airport (closed) – Ponta do Sol, Santo Antão
 GVBA (BVC) – Aristides Pereira International Airport – Rabil, Boa Vista 
 GVMA (MMO) – Maio Airport – Vila do Maio, Maio
 GVMT (MTI) – Mosteiros Airport (closed) – Mosteiros, Fogo
 GVNP (RAI) – Praia International Airport – Santiago, Praia
 GVSF (SFL) – São Filipe Airport – São Filipe, Fogo
 GVSN (SNE) – São Nicolau Airport – Preguiça, São Nicolau
 GVSV (VXE) – Cesária Évora Airport – São Pedro, São Vicente

References

 
  - includes IATA codes
 Aviation Safety Network - IATA and ICAO airport codes

G
Airports by ICAO code
Airports by ICAO code
Airports by ICAO code
Airports by ICAO code
Airports by ICAO code
Airports by ICAO code
Airports by ICAO code
Airports by ICAO code
Airports by ICAO code